"Decent Days and Nights" is the 2nd single by the Futureheads from their album The Futureheads. The remix of the song by Shy Child was released as a vinyl split single by Oxfam with the Black Strobe remix of Bloc Party's song 'Like Eating Glass' included. The song was included on the soundtrack of Burnout 3: Takedown.

Track listing 

Split single (with Bloc Party)

In popular culture 
 Appears on the soundtrack to Burnout 3: Takedown and Rugby 2005.
 Appears as a downloadable song for the Rock Band series.

Personnel 
 Barry Hyde: lead vocals, guitar
 Ross Millard: guitar, backing vocals
 David "Jaff" Craig: bass, backing vocals
 Dave Hyde: drums, backing vocals

References

External links 
 

The Futureheads songs
2004 singles
Song recordings produced by Paul Epworth
2004 songs
679 Artists singles
Sire Records singles
Songs written by Ross Millard